Henry Bodenham (1511/12 – 1573), of Ebbesborne Wake, Wiltshire, was an English politician.

He was a Member (MP) of the Parliament of England for Wiltshire in 1555 and for Wilton in 1559.

Notable accomplishments include serving Boulogne under Sir Tomas Poynings in 1545 and investigating allegations of embezzlement at South Newton in February of 1546. 

On 1 October 1555, he became a knight of the shire with the help of the Earl of Pembroke.

References

1510s births
1573 deaths
People from Wiltshire
English MPs 1555
English MPs 1559